The Buffalo Bandits are a lacrosse team based in Buffalo, New York playing in the National Lacrosse League (NLL). The 2008 season was the franchise's 17th season.

The Bandits tied with Minnesota, New York, and Philadelphia with a 10-6 record but thanks to tiebreakers, clinched first place overall and home floor advantage throughout the playoffs. They beat the Philadelphia Wings 14-12 in the opening round of the playoffs, then made quick work of the New York Titans 19-12, before they beat the Portland LumberJax 14-13 to win their first championship since 1996.

Regular season

Conference standings

Game log
Reference:

Playoffs

Game log
Reference:

Player stats
Reference:

Runners (Top 10)

Note: GP = Games played; G = Goals; A = Assists; Pts = Points; LB = Loose Balls; PIM = Penalty Minutes

Goaltenders
Note: GP = Games played; MIN = Minutes; W = Wins; L = Losses; GA = Goals against; Sv% = Save percentage; GAA = Goals against average

Awards

Transactions

Trades

Roster
Reference:

See also
2008 NLL season

References

Buffalo
National Lacrosse League Champion's Cup-winning seasons